Henry Baynton (fl. 1572 – 1593) was an English politician who was a Member (MP) of the Parliament of England for Malmesbury in 1572, Devizes in 1584, 1586 and 1593 and for Old Sarum in 1589.

He was the first son of Sir Edward Bayntun's second wife Isabel Leigh. On his mother's death in 1573 he inherited Faulston manor (Bishopstone, near Salisbury) but it was soon sold.

His biographer in The History of Parliament records him as "of Woodford, Wilts." and notes that he "sat for an assortment of Wiltshire boroughs, without leaving any mark on the known proceedings of the House".

References

16th-century births
Year of death missing
English MPs 1572–1583
English MPs 1584–1585
English MPs 1586–1587
English MPs 1589
English MPs 1593